Michael Andrew Johnson (born 31 January 1970), an Australian federal politician, was a member of the Australian House of Representatives for the seat of Ryan, Queensland, from 2001 to 2010, representing the Liberal Party from November 2001 to May 2010 and then as an independent from May 2010 until he was defeated at the 2010 federal election in August 2010.

Early years and education
He was born in Hong Kong, and was educated at St. Peters Lutheran College and later at the University of Queensland, the University of Cambridge, where he obtained an MPhil, and the University of Birmingham, where he obtained a master's degree in international studies. He was the Australian Chevening Scholar in 1994, the Charles Hawker Memorial Scholar in 1996 and was a 2004 graduate of Harvard Kennedy School’s Executive Leaders’ Program at Harvard. He lives in Brisbane's western suburbs with his wife, Huyen, and their son Ryan. Huyen went on and became a teacher. After leaving his political life he started to run a privately owned business networking company (East Coast Forum) with Huyen and Ryan that both help out. Michael is also the current chairman of (Orbitz Elevators). 

Johnson was a barrister and a university tutor and lecturer before entering politics. He was named in 2007 as a Young Global Leader (YGL) by the Geneva-based World Economic Forum (WEF). He is Chairman of the Australia-China Business Forum, and is a Member of the Asia Society's International Advisory Board and sits on the Australian Advisory Board.

Political career

Johnson first sought to gain Liberal endorsement for Ryan, following the retirement of long-serving member, John Moore. Factional rivalries between Johnson and other candidates for preselection led to rampant branch stacking. Johnson had been expected to win preselection, having arranged many of the new members in local branches. He was accused by opponents in the party of signing up ethnic Chinese with only limited connections to the Liberal Party, many from outside the Ryan electorate, and in at least one case, outside Australia. Unfortunately for Johnson, it was revealed he had failed to properly renounce his British citizenship and was ruled ineligible to contest preselection. Former state Liberal President Bob Tucker won preselection for the by-election, losing that contest to Labor's Leonie Short. However, by the time of the 2001 Federal election, Johnson had sorted out his citizenship and won Liberal preselection.  He then easily took the seat back from Short on an eight-point swing.

There have also been public allegations regarding internal party funds, what he describes as his "unorthodox" fundraising of asking businesses for fees for introductions he facilitates in his capacity as an MP, and the alleged improper use of a publicly funded vehicle.

Johnson previously held the position of Opposition Whip in the Federal Liberal Party. He resigned from the post when allegations that he had misused his taxpayer funded vehicle were investigated.

Expulsion from the LNP

In 2010, controversy emerged regarding business dealings involving Johnson and the Australia-China Business Forum, of which he was the Chair. On 20 May 2010, he was expelled from the Liberal National Party, the Queensland branch of the Liberal and National parties. Johnson vowed to contest Ryan as an Independent at the 2010 federal election. In June 2010, Jane Prentice, a Brisbane City Councillor, was chosen by the LNP to stand for Ryan.

On 2 June 2010, Johnson read out a letter to Parliament which he sent to the Australian Federal Police alleging he was subject to "illegal pressure" to resign from Federal Parliament by the Liberal National Party President Bruce McIver, during a meeting on 25 February in Canberra. During the meeting Johnson claimed that McIver produced a large black folder which he alleged contained material and documents that was evidence of alleged criminal behaviour by Johnson. McIver denies the claims that he asked him to resign from Parliament, though openly admits he asked Johnson to quit the LNP.

Independent election attempts 

He stood unsuccessfully as an independent candidate in:
 At the 2010 federal election, Johnson stood as an independent candidate in the Division of Ryan and secured less than 9% of the primary vote and was easily defeated by Liberal National candidate, Jane Prentice.
 The Electoral district of Maiwar in the 2020 Queensland state election. He scored less than 1% of first preference votes.

References

Liberal Party of Australia members of the Parliament of Australia
Liberal National Party of Queensland members of the Parliament of Australia
Independent members of the Parliament of Australia
Members of the Australian House of Representatives
Members of the Australian House of Representatives for Ryan
1970 births
Living people
Hong Kong emigrants to Australia
Australian politicians of Hong Kong descent
Alumni of the University of Cambridge
Alumni of the University of Birmingham
21st-century Australian politicians